Vito Schnabel (born July 27, 1986) is an American art dealer and owner of Vito Schnabel Gallery, with locations in New York, Santa Monica, and St. Moritz, Switzerland.

Biography 
Schnabel (born 1986) was born and raised in New York City. He is the son of artist and filmmaker Julian Schnabel and Belgian designer Jacqueline Beaurang. Schnabel attended Saint Ann's School in Brooklyn and Columbia University.

Schnabel organized his first exhibition at the age of 16, a group show in New York in 2003. Two years later, he presented a solo exhibition of paintings by American artist Ron Gorchov. Gorchov's work had not been shown in over a decade, and Schnabel’s exhibition led to a resurgent interest in the artist's work, including a solo exhibition the following year at MoMA PS1. Other early exhibitions presented by Schnabel include a show of Terence Koh's paintings at Richard Avedon's former studio in New York in 2008; several exhibitions of Rene Ricard's paintings in New York, Los Angeles, and London; and an exhibition of Laurie Anderson's paintings and drawings in New York in 2012. Schnabel has organized several major group exhibitions in temporary gallery settings, including DSM-V, curated by David Rimanelli, at the Farley Post Office in New York in 2013, and First Show / Last Show, presented in 2015 at the Germania Bank Building on the Bowery, which had not been open to the public since the mid-1960s.

In 2013, Schnabel opened his first permanent gallery space in New York City, on Clarkson Street in the West Village. In 2015, Vito Schnabel Gallery’s second location opened in St. Moritz, in the former gallery space of celebrated art dealer Bruno Bischofberger's, a lifelong friend and mentor to Schnabel. Bischofberger was the first gallerist to establish a space in St. Moritz in 1963. The inaugural exhibition at the Swiss outpost of Vito Schnabel Gallery was Urs Fischer: Bruno & Yoyo.

In 2021, Vito Schnabel Gallery opened two more locations, including a gallery on West 19th Street in New York’s Chelsea Arts District, and an exhibition space in the historic Old Santa Monica Post Office in Santa Monica, California.

Vito Schnabel Gallery works with artists Trey Abdella, Laurie Anderson, Francesco Clemente, Jeff Elrod, Urs Fischer, Walton Ford, Jorge Galindo, Chaz Guest, Jordan Kerwick, Spencer Lewis, Caitlin Lonegan, Robert Nava, Mariana Oushiro, Ariana Papademetropoulos, Sterling Ruby, Tom Sachs, Julian Schnabel, Pat Steir, Gus Van Sant, Thomas Woodruff, and the estates of Lance De Los Reyes, Ron Gorchov, and Rene Ricard.

Schnabel works closely with Major Food Group, a restaurant group that operates restaurants such as Carbone and ZZ's Clam Bar. Schnabel partners with them in many of their ventures, including curating the art in several of their restaurants.

In 2021, Schnabel founded ArtOfficial in partnership with Gary and A.J. Vaynerchuk. It is the first independent online auction platform launched by a gallery to offer NFT and digital works by internationally acclaimed artists.

Schnabel is also a filmmaker. Schnabel co-wrote, directed, and produced the short Don’t Look For Me starring Maya Hawke in 2020. Schnabel is producing and starring in an upcoming feature film The Trainer (2023). The film will be a dark comedy following a fitness expert living with his mother in Los Angeles pursuing his version of the American dream. The script will be based on an original story by Schnabel and co-written with Jeff Solomon. The Trainer began filming in Los Angeles in April 2022, directed by Tony Kaye and starring Schnabel along with a large ensemble cast.

References

1986 births
Living people
American people of Jewish descent
American people of Belgian descent
Place of birth missing (living people)
American art dealers
Saint Ann's School (Brooklyn) alumni
Columbia University alumni